Green Castle Airport  is a private airport northwest of Iowa City, Iowa, USA. It is a base for Green Castle Aero Club.

External links
Green Castle aero club (official web site)

Airports in Iowa
Transportation buildings and structures in Johnson County, Iowa